The 10,000 Lakes Festival (abbreviated as 10KLF) was an annual four-day music festival in Detroit Lakes, Minnesota, at the Soo Pass Ranch that was held from 2003 until 2009 before going on indefinite hiatus due to financial losses and has not been held since 2010. Its name refers to Minnesota's nickname, "The Land of 10,000 Lakes". The lineups generally include jam and bluegrass bands.

The festival was held on over 600 acres (243 ha) and had four stages: Main, Field, Barn, and Saloon. (The stages are listed by size, beginning with the largest.)  Campgrounds were able to be reserved and running water provided permanent restrooms and showers.

10,000 Lakes Festival by year
2009 10,000 Lakes Festival
2008 10,000 Lakes Festival
2007 10,000 Lakes Festival
2006 10,000 Lakes Festival
2005 10,000 Lakes Festival
2004 10,000 Lakes Festival
2003 10,000 Lakes Festival

Stages
 Main Stage - Headliners perform here.  This stage accommodates the most room for listeners.
 Field Stage - As its name suggests, the Field Stage is located in front of a field, allowing room for acts that attract large crowds.
 Barn Stage - This stage is located at the base of a hill and features a translucent canopy for shade.
 Saloon Stage - Acts that attract the smallest crowds are booked in a saloon, which stays open later than all other stages.

See also

List of bluegrass music festivals
List of jam band music festivals

References

External links
 10klf.com Official 10,000 Lakes Festival website

 
Folk festivals in the United States
Music festivals in Minnesota
Rock festivals in the United States
Bluegrass festivals
Jam band festivals
Music festivals established in 2003
2003 establishments in Minnesota